The PMD-6, PMD-7 and PMD-57 series mines are Soviet Union blast-type anti-personnel mines that consist of a wooden box with a hinged lid with a slot cut into it. The slot presses down against a retaining pin, which holds back the striker. When sufficient pressure is applied to the lid of the box the retaining pin moves, allowing the striker to hit the detonator. The mines typically have an operating pressure of 1 to 10 kg. All the mines in the series use Metal Oxide Varistor series fuzes.

As with other wooden box mines, the mine has a relatively short lifetime since the box is vulnerable to rotting and splitting, disabling the mine. 

The mines are sometimes used with mortar bombs in place of the normal explosive blocks.

Variants
 PMD-6 - original version of the mine, first used in the 1939 Winter War between the Soviet Union and Finland.
 PMD-6M - slightly larger version of the mine, with a leaf spring installed inside the box to increase operating pressure, which allows safer handling during minelaying.
 PMD-6F - a version used extensively during the Siege of Leningrad, with an ammonium nitrate/fuel oil (ANFO) main charge.
 PMD-7 - smaller version of the mine, using a cylindrical main charge.
 PMD-7ts - consists of a solid wooden block hollowed out to accept the main charge and fuse.
 PMD-57 - A later, larger box mine, using a larger warhead.

Specifications

Similar mines
 Schu-mine 42, PP Mi-D, Type 59, PMD-1

See also
Anti-personnel mine
Land mine

References
 Brassey's Essential Guide To Anti-Personnel Landmines, Recognizing and Disarming, Eddie Banks, 
 Jane's Mines and Mine Clearance 2005-2006
 TM 5-223, Foreign Mine Warfare Equipment

External links

 
 
 

Anti-personnel mines
Land mines of the Soviet Union
Military equipment introduced in the 1930s